Miguel Augusto Riffo Garay (born 21 June 1981) is a Chilean former professional football player and the current assistant manager of Coquimbo Unido.

Club career
Product of Colo-Colo youth ranks, he won eight titles in his career with that club. In the 2000s, algonside his teammates Claudio Bravo, Luis Mena and Fernando Meneses, he also studied a technical-professional career in physical activity at the University of the Americas.

His most successful moment with the coach Claudio Borghi, when he also was named during the 2007 season at the Chilean Primera División Best Eleven. Although Riffo was born with a club foot, that complicated him very much, because he had to make several operations in his foot. In the 2010 season, he abandoned the club, because the Argentine coach Diego Cagna not considered him for the next season and in January 2011, he signed for Santiago Morning.

In March 2012, he announced his retirement from professional football, because Morning was relegated to the Primera B and also Riffo was titled as football coach at the ANFP, the last season that he played.

International career
He also has represented the Chile national team on several occasions. He played in one game during the Copa América 2007 versus Brazil in which he committed a penalty. Later in the match Riffo was injured for the tournament. Riffo played in the first four games of the 2010 FIFA World Cup qualification for Chile. Riffo started the first four games receiving a yellow card against Argentina. However, he was not recalled after the fourth match for the rest of the qualification process.

Honours

Club
Colo-Colo
 Primera División (7): 2002–C, 2006–A, 2006–C, 2007–A, 2007–C, 2008–C, 2009–C
 Copa Sudamericana: Runner-up 2006

Individual
 Primera División de Chile Team Of The Season: 2007

References

External links
 

1981 births
Living people
Chilean people of Italian descent
Footballers from Santiago
Chilean footballers
Association football defenders
Chilean Primera División players
Colo-Colo footballers
University of the Americas (Chile) alumni
Santiago Morning footballers
Chile international footballers
2007 Copa América players
Chilean football managers
Unión La Calera managers
Deportes Iquique managers
Chilean Primera División managers
People from Santiago
People from Santiago Province, Chile
People from Santiago Metropolitan Region